Tomás Becerra (born 7 September 1953) is a Colombian former swimmer who competed in the 1968 Summer Olympics, in the 1972 Summer Olympics, and in the 1976 Summer Olympics.

References

1953 births
Living people
Colombian male freestyle swimmers
Pan American Games competitors for Colombia
Olympic swimmers of Colombia
Swimmers at the 1968 Summer Olympics
Swimmers at the 1971 Pan American Games
Swimmers at the 1972 Summer Olympics
Swimmers at the 1976 Summer Olympics
Central American and Caribbean Games gold medalists for Colombia
Competitors at the 1970 Central American and Caribbean Games
Central American and Caribbean Games medalists in swimming
20th-century Colombian people
21st-century Colombian people